Poggio San Vicino is a comune (municipality) in the Province of Macerata in the Italian region Marche, located about  southwest of Ancona and about  northwest of Macerata.

Poggio San Vicino borders the following municipalities: Apiro, Cerreto d'Esi, Fabriano, Matelica, Serra San Quirico.

Among the churches is Santa Maria Assunta.

Demographic evolution

References

Cities and towns in the Marche